TaraSpan is a multinational company with headquarters in Ottawa, Canada and Gurgaon, India. The company also has offices in Mumbai, Pune and Bengaluru. It is known as TaraSpan Solutions Pvt. Ltd in the Indian subcontinent. TaraSpan provides global support services to technology companies. The company also sells technology products that support unified communications, IP Telephony, Video Conferencing, Networking & Security solutions to Indian companies.

History 

TaraSpan was founded as a small partnership in 2005 by Mike Manson and Raj Narula, who took over an existing but financially strapped business in Ottawa.  They began to introduce Ottawa entrepreneurs to customers and potential partners in India.  In 2007 Terry Mathews made a minority investment in the company through his personal holding company, Kanata-based Wesley Clover.  At first the Indian part of the company was known as Wesley Clover Communications Solutions. Matthews later served as the company's chairman.

In 2008, TaraSpan acquired Telesoft, a software development company which was founded in 1996 and based in Pune, India.  As well as offshore software product development and maintenance, the company provides various telecommunications and internet-based voice and data services.

In 2010 Taraspan had 65 employees and was operating in eight cities in India. Much of the company business was in developing partnerships between Canadian and Indian companies. By 2011 TaraSpan had developed into a multinational company with the opening of offices in Gurgaon, Mumbai, Pune and Bengaluru and one in Bristol, UK.  At this time it had 140 employees.

In 2012 TaraSpan was one of a number of companies showcased as part of a business roundtable by Canadian Prime Minister Stephen Harper in India to promote trade between the two countries.

In 2016 Taraspan continues to provide market entry assessment and market entry strategy development, and represents Canadian companies in India in a number of business aspects.  The company also provides software engineering and support services, communication and internet services and customized training programs. Taraspan also sells hardware and software related to its services.

References

External links 

 Official website

Companies based in Ottawa
Companies established in 2005
Consulting firms of Canada